Karalar is a town (belde) in the İdil District of Şırnak Province in Turkey. The settlement is populated by Kurds of the Domanan tribe and had a population of 4,065 in 2021.

References 

Populated places in Şırnak Province
Towns in Turkey
Kurdish settlements in Şırnak Province